Physical design can refer to

Physical database design - see also Physical data model
Physical design (electronics)